The Neils Peter Larsen House, at 1146 N. One Hundred E. Pleasant Grove, Utah, was built in 1870.  It is a soft rock house built to replace use of a dugout.  Neils Peter Larsen had homesteaded a farm in 1862.  The dugout and house served one of Larsen's three polygamous wives and a family; the other two wives and one family lived about a mile away.

The house was listed on the National Register of Historic Places in 1987.

See also
Christen Larsen House, also NRHP-listed in Pleasant Grove

References

Houses on the National Register of Historic Places in Utah
Houses completed in 1870
Houses in Utah County, Utah
1870 establishments in Utah Territory
National Register of Historic Places in Utah County, Utah
Buildings and structures in Pleasant Grove, Utah